The 2021–22 UEFA Youth League was the eighth season of the UEFA Youth League, a European youth club football competition organised by UEFA.

Real Madrid, having won the title in 2019–20, were the title holders, since the 2020–21 edition was cancelled due to the COVID-19 pandemic in Europe and the title was not awarded. They were eliminated by city rivals Atlético Madrid in the round of 16.

Portuguese side Benfica won their first title, beating Red Bull Salzburg 6–0 in the final. This was a replay of the 2017 final, won by Salzburg by 2–1. It was also Benfica's first title in European football since the 1961–62 European Cup. In August, Benfica played the inaugural Under-20 Intercontinental Cup, beating the CONMEBOL champions, Peñarol, 1–0.

Teams
A total of 64 teams from at least 32 of the 55 UEFA member associations may enter the tournament. They are split into two sections, each with 32 teams.
UEFA Champions League Path:  The youth teams of the 32 clubs which qualified for the 2021–22 UEFA Champions League group stage entered the UEFA Champions League Path. If there was a vacancy (youth teams not entering), it was filled by a team defined by UEFA.
Domestic Champions Path: The youth domestic champions of the top 32 associations according to their 2021 UEFA country coefficients entered the Domestic Champions Path. If there was a vacancy (associations with no youth domestic competition, as well as youth domestic champions already included in the UEFA Champions League path), it was first filled by the title holders should they have not yet qualified, and then by the youth domestic champions of the next association in the UEFA ranking.

Akademia e Futbollit, Angers, Deportivo La Coruña, Daugavpils, Empoli, Hajduk Split, 1. FC Köln, Miercurea Ciuc, Pogoń Szczecin, St Patrick's Athletic, Trabzonspor, Žalgiris and Zvijezda 09 will make their tournament debuts. Lithuania will be represented for the first time.

Notes

Round and draw dates
The schedule of the competition is as follows (all draws were held at the UEFA headquarters in Nyon, Switzerland, unless stated otherwise).
For the UEFA Champions League Path group stage, in principle the teams play their matches on Tuesdays and Wednesdays of the matchdays as scheduled for UEFA Champions League, and on the same day as the corresponding senior teams; however, matches could also be played on other dates, including Mondays and Thursdays.
For the Domestic Champions Path first and second rounds, in principle matches are played on Wednesdays (first round on matchdays 2 and 3, second round on matchdays 4 and 5, as scheduled for UEFA Champions League); however, matches could also be played on other dates, including Mondays, Tuesdays and Thursdays.

UEFA Champions League Path

For the UEFA Champions League Path, the 32 teams were drawn into eight groups of four. There was no separate draw held, with the group compositions identical to the draw for the 2021–22 UEFA Champions League group stage, which was held on 26 August 2021, 18:00 CEST (19:00 TRT), in Istanbul, Turkey.

In each group, teams played against each other home-and-away in a round-robin format. The group winners advance to the round of 16, while the eight runners-up advance to the play-offs, where they will join by the eight second round winners from the Domestic Champions Path.

Group A

Group B

Group C

Group D

Group E

Group F

Group G

Group H

Domestic Champions Path

For the Domestic Champions Path, the 32 teams were drawn into two rounds of two-legged home-and-away ties. The draw for both the first round and second round was held on 31 August 2021.

The eight second round winners advance to the play-offs, where they will join by the eight group runners-up from the UEFA Champions League Path (group stage).

First round

Second round

Knockout phase

Bracket

Play-offs

Round of 16

Quarter-finals

Semi-finals

Final

Top goalscorers

U-20 Intercontinental Cup 
The UEFA champions, Benfica, played against the CONMEBOL champion, Peñarol, for the new U-20 Intercontinental Cup, a youth team equivalent to the former Intercontinental Cup, which featured the senior club champions of Europe and South America. Benfica won 1–0.

Notes

References

External links

UEFA Youth League matches 2021–22, UEFA.com

 
Youth
2021-22
2021 in youth association football
2022 in youth association football